Japy is a French surname. Notable people with this surname include:

 Arthur Japy Hepburn (1877–1964), American admiral
 Camille Japy (born 1968), Belgian-French actress
 Joséphine Japy (born 1994), French actress
 Louis Aimé Japy (1840–1916), French painter